The Allegheny National Fish Hatchery was established by Congress in 1959 to produce rainbow, brook, and brown trout for northwestern Pennsylvania streams. Construction began in the late 1960s. Fish production began on site in 1974.

Lake trout production
The current goal of the facility is to produce lake trout for restoration in Lake Erie and Lake Ontario. Allegheny National Fish Hatchery is the only U.S. hatchery tasked with producing fish for the bi-national effort.

The lake trout, Salvelinus namaycush, is a cold water fish of the charr family. The largest of the trout species, it is a deepwater fish which is a cousin to the familiar and popular brook trout (Salvelinus fontinalis). The lake trout is native to the northeast United States and Canada, and it was once a top predator fish in the Great Lakes. Its numbers have dropped due to the introduction of exotic, non-native species such as the sea lamprey, loss of habitat and historic overharvest.

Annually producing as many as 1.3 million fish in the early 1990s, the hatchery now produces an estimated 660,000 fish for Lake Erie and Lake Ontario. It maintains a broodstock population of approximately 2000 fish. Broodstock are used to produce eggs for Lake Michigan as well as for the Erie and Ontario programs.

Nearby fishing pier at Kinzua Dam
Access to the fishing pier is closed during winter road conditions.

External links
Allegheny National Fish Hatchery official site

This article incorporates public domain material from websites or documents of the United States Fish and Wildlife Service.

National Fish Hatcheries of the United States
Buildings and structures in Warren County, Pennsylvania
Tourist attractions in Warren County, Pennsylvania
Agricultural buildings and structures in Pennsylvania